St Kilda is a coastal suburb in Adelaide, South Australia. Its seafront faces the Barker Inlet, which is part of the Port River estuarine area, the largest tidal estuary of Gulf St Vincent, and includes a large area of mangroves. St Kilda is an internationally recognised bird watching area with over 100 species of birds feeding in and around the mudflats, salt lagoons, mangroves and seagrass beds, which are part of the estuarine ecosystem.

St Kilda has a small number of houses and a 2016 population of 70. There is a single connecting road from the suburb to the rest of Adelaide. The inhabited section of the suburb occupies less than  along the seafront. The remainder of the land was formerly used for extensive salt evaporation ponds, although these are much fewer in number now. The settlement ponds of the Bolivar Waste Water Treatment Plant occupy some of the southern end of the suburb. St Kilda is bordered by Buckland Park to the north, Waterloo Corner to the east-north-east, Bolivar to the south and south-east, and Gulf St Vincent to the west.

The suburb is home to a number of tourist attractions, including an adventure playground, tram museum, mangrove forest walk and an abundance of birdlife.

History

Pre-colonial
Prior to the 1836 British colonisation of South Australia, the area was inhabited by the Kaurna people, who occupied the land from Cape Jervis in the south up the western side of the Fleurieu Peninsula, to Crystal Brook in the north, east to the Mount Lofty Ranges, across to Gulf Saint Vincent, including the Adelaide Plains and city of Adelaide. They called the Port River region and estuary Yerta Bulti (also spelt Yertabulti), meaning "land of sleep or death".

The Kaurna people made much use of the estuarine area for hunting and gathering food as well as materials which they made into artefacts and tools. They made use of the natural resources; for example, they used to trap and spear fish (kuya), lobsters (ngaultaltya) and birds (parriparu), and also gathered bird's eggs, black river mussels (kakirra, species Alathyria jacksoni), periwinkle (kulutunumi), river crawfish (kunggurla – probably common yabby), clams, native mud oysters and blue swimmer crabs. However, they did not kill the black swans, as this was forbidden. The reeds, blue flax lily and rushes (probably Juncus kraussii, the salt marsh rush) were used for weaving baskets and nets – the latter used for not only fish, but game such as kangaroo and emu. Dolphins were known as yambo.

After European settlement
Before the town (later suburb) was established, there were three low-lying islands that were covered in shell grit and saltbush and surrounded by mangrove and samphire swamps. Settler fishermen had established huts on the islands by 1865, and by 1873 there were 13 huts and a boathouse recorded when the area was surveyed by Thomas Evans. By the 1890s people were visiting the islands, attracted to the supposed curative properties of the mangrove mud, using the beach for bathing and fishing for crabs. An early settler in the area was John Harvey, the founder of nearby Salisbury, who gave the area its name, as it reminded him of the island of St Kilda in the Outer Hebrides of Scotland, which also has abundant birdlife. (In fact, there is no saint of that name.)

In 1886 the St Kilda area became part of the Munno Para West District Council (which had been founded in 1854), along with Virginia West. It was proclaimed a town on 31 July 1893, with sales of the first allotments made on the same day.

The St Kilda Hotel, built out of limestone from east of what is now Elizabeth, opened in 1898 with Matthias Lucas as the first publican and remains the suburb's only hotel. A school opened in October 1902, where the tram museum is now sited, admitting students in November of the same year. The school was closed from 1917 to 1924 and finally closed permanently in 1949, with students moving to Salisbury North Primary School and the building eventually being used at Virginia Primary School.

St Kilda was moved to the new District Council of Salisbury (later City of Salisbury) on 22 June or 1 July 1933 along with most of the Munno Para West area.

The islands were extensively modified after floods in 1948 and 1957, which cut off St Kilda from the rest of Adelaide. Salisbury Council began building up the area, expanding seawalls and reclaiming additional land by dumping of earth spoil.

In 1924 a telegraph office opened in Shell Street and, due to the suburb of St Kilda in Melbourne having the same name, the post office service requested that the name be changed. Over some local objections the name was changed to Moilong (a Kaurna word for where the tide comes in), but this was reversed after local protests. Moilong Telegraph Office opened in 1924, was upgraded to a post office in 1945, renamed Saint Kilda in 1965 and closed in 1974.

Imperial Chemical Industries (ICI) began construction of the Solar Evaporation Lagoons in 1935, using up to 600 workers to dig out the lagoons by hand and then expanded them mechanically after World War II.

St Kilda's population has never been large, with 50 non-permanent residents counted in the 1901 census, 68 (including 20 permanent) in 1911, 30 total residents in 1933, 80 in 2002, increasing to 246 by 2006, but dropping to 70 (11 families) in 2016.

Geography and environment

However, many of the saltfields have closed, and land and water rehabilitation is taking place.

Salt fields

The coast side of the mangroves are bounded by extensive salt evaporation ponds leased for industrial usage by the South Australian Government, although today most of these salt fields are no longer used. The Department of the Premier and Cabinet (DPC) is responsible for regulating the salt fields, under the Mining Act 1971, which includes the necessity for establishment of a program for environment protection and rehabilitation.

As of 2006 the lagoons were operated by Cheetham Salt Limited, with 600,000 tonnes of salt used by Penrice Soda Products in creating soda ash via the solvay process. The lagoons were filled in spring and the salt normally harvested in autumn, when it was piped as saturated brine solution to Osborne on the Le Fevre peninsula, and used by Penrice in the only soda ash production facility in Australia.

The Penrice plant closed in 2014, helping to improve the water quality, along with reduced flows and improved quality being emitted from the Bolivar Waste Water Treatment Plant. Cheetham Salt now obtains its sea salt from Price, on the Yorke Peninsula and Bajool, Queensland.

In November 2020, investigations were under way after it was noticed that significant areas of mangrove had died off. Brine had recently been pumped into the Dry Creek salt fields by plant managers Buckland Dry Creek company, after six years of being empty and being allowed to dry out. As of 2021, the area of impact has been estimated to exceed 190 hectares, placing the St Kilda salt fields brine spill among the worst marine environmental disasters in South Australia's history.

Flora and fauna

Flora
The mangroves found on the coastline of St Kilda consist of a single species, Avicennia marina var resinifera.  In the upper intertidal zone mangroves are reduced in size landwards and give way to a variety of samphire species, including beaded glasswort (Tecticornia flabelliformis) and blackseed glasswort (Tecticornia pergranulata) as well as saltbush on the saltflats of the supratidal zone. Nitre bush grows on the highest parts of the seawall and the abundant summer fruits provide a food source for birds.

Fauna
St Kilda is part of a nursery area for many of the commercially important fish and crustaceans in South Australia, including King George whiting, western king prawns and blue swimmer crabs. There are brown snakes and skinks in dense bushes along the top of the embankments.

Each year in late summer thousands of black swans and ducks descend on the area as the inland waterways they inhabit dry up. Waterbirds such as pelicans, cormorants, oyster catchers and terns are common often year round. Egrets, ibis, herons and spoonbills feed on the seagrass and fairy wrens, chats, fantails and thornbills feed on insects and plants amongst the samphire. Each September stints and sandpipers arrive from the Northern Hemisphere in a spectacular display. With the abundance of birdlife the area attracts birds of prey with swamp harriers, collared sparrowhawks, black-shouldered kites, kestrels and little falcons are all seen in the skies over St Kilda.

The salt lagoons, mangroves and samphire wetlands are recognised as important areas for migratory birds by their coverage under the China-Australia and Japan-Australia migratory bird agreements. The agreements are treaties created to for the protection of the birds and their environment.

Protected areas
The waters and shorelines of St Kilda are part of several overlapping protected areas.

Adelaide Dolphin Sanctuary

Adelaide International Bird Sanctuary

Barker Inlet – St Kilda Aquatic Reserve
The mangrove trail boardwalk is within the Barker Inlet – St Kilda Aquatic Reserve, where the taking of crabs, shellfish and plants is prohibited and pets are not allowed. The mangroves, saltmarsh and adjacent lagoons form a habitat for over 200 bird species, with the mangroves being part of a nursery area for most of the commercial and recreational fish species of Gulf St Vincent. The 2005 Adelaide Dolphin Sanctuary Act established a sanctuary for the Bottlenose dolphins that live in the inlet and adjacent Port River. The sanctuary's northern extent is the boat channel (see below).

Gulf St Vincent Important Bird Area

St Kilda – Chapman Creek Aquatic Reserve

Attractions and facilities

Mangrove trail and interpretative centre

St Kilda is adjacent to the mangrove forest bordering Barker Inlet, part of the largest tidal estuary of Gulf St Vincent. Late in the 19th Century embankments were constructed through the mangroves in an effort to reclaim land for pasturing. With the construction of the banks of the adjacent saltfields, maintenance of the embankments ceased and the mangroves began to reclaim them. One of these embankments is used as the beginning of a boardwalk through the mangroves which forms a  loop through the samphire saltmarsh flats and mangroves reaching the border between the ocean and forest.

The boardwalk was constructed in 1984 by the City of Salisbury to encourage appreciation of the mangrove's ecological importance. On 29 April 1995, South Australian Premier Dean Brown and federal MP Chris Schacht opened the St Kilda Interpretative Centre at the entrance to the boardwalk which showcases the flora, fauna and processes within the mangrove forest. Since 1997 the mangrove trail has been privately managed, hosting school visits as well as casual visitors.

The trail is sometimes completely closed due to weather conditions, and in 2020 parts of the trail were closed for maintenance.

Adventure playground

St Kilda Adventure Playground covers  along the seafront and is one of South Australia's best-known playgrounds. It has a constructed shipwreck, wooden castle, huge slides, a spiral slide inside a hill, flying foxes and numerous other pieces of play equipment, with South Australian children naming it in 2002 as the best adventure park in the state. It includes a shaded set of equipment shaped like a submarine for younger children, and a small maze, basketball courts, and a "bouncy boomerang".

The park was conceived by the Lions Club of Salisbury and funded through club fundraising activities, council matching funding and government employment schemes providing free labour. It was opened by Salisbury mayor Ron White on 24 October 1982, and has had several upgrades since, including a $3.5 million renewal in 2016.

Boating and fishing
St Kilda Boat Club, run by volunteers, is situated lies at the shore end of the long sheltered channel, which provides deep enough water for boats to get out to sea and also serves as a breakwater. There is an extensive marina with floating moorings for about 50 boats, two boat ramps and a sheltered channel out into the Barker Inlet, part of Gulf St Vincent.

The boat club was founded as the "St Kilda Boatowners Association Incorporated" in 1964, after permission was gained from the council and landowners to develop St Kilda tidal creek as the area lacked boat launching facilities. The creek was straightened and deepened repeatedly, originally by hand, and a causeway extended out to sea to protect the channel. A new clubhouse was opened by South Australian MP Lynn Arnold in 1980, and a new boat ramp in 2002 by the mayor of Salisbury Tony Zappia.

The breakwater is regularly used for recreational fishing, especially for salmon trout, whiting (including King George whiting) and bream.

Tramway Museum

The Tramway Museum, St Kilda is built on the site of the 1902 school and showcases trolleybuses and trams and that were either used or built in Adelaide. The museum is dedicated to preserving and restoring Adelaide's former transport vehicles. It houses over 30 electric trams, horse trams and electric trolley buses, many of which are restored and operational. Visitors can ride the electric trams along 2 km of purpose-built track that runs between the museum and the adventure playground.

The first vehicle was a trolley bus donated from the Municipal Tramways Trust in 1958 with others soon following. The museum opened as a static display in 1967. Workshops were built to enable the restoration of the old trams to operating condition. ICI, then operator of the salt lagoons, donated land for the tramway to run next to St Kilda Road. The tramway opened for trials in 1973 and was officially opened in 1974 by Harry Bowey, mayor of Salisbury, and Frank Kneebone, Minister for Lands, to coincide with St Kilda's centenary. In 2001 a large additional museum building was completed to house the increasing number of donated trams.

Transport
Prior to 2019, St Kilda Road was the only access road and connected directly to Port Wakefield Road at Waterloo Corner. As part of construction of the Northern Connector, this was replaced by a link to the bridge over the expressway at Waterloo Corner Road and access from the north. St Kilda can be driven to from Salisbury in approximately 10 minutes and from Adelaide's CBD in 30 minutes. There are no scheduled bus services with the nearest public transport being Adelaide Metro 900 bus route which passes along Port Wakefield Road, 2 kilometres outside the suburb's boundary.

Weather
Adelaide has a Mediterranean climate with St Kilda being slightly hotter and drier than the Adelaide average. Summer daytime temperatures can be expected to exceed 40 °C on 4 days of the year. Conversely, nighttime temperatures in winter are expected to drop below 0 °C on 1 day, although generally the season is mild with moderate rainfall.

Notes

References

Suburbs of Adelaide
Nature reserves in South Australia